Air 2000 and First Choice Airways served the following destinations before merging with Thomsonfly (Thomson Airways destinations for the merged destinations):

References

First Choice Airways